Arctostaphylos nevadensis, with the common name pinemat manzanita, is a species of manzanita.

Distribution

Arctostaphylos nevadensis is native to western North America from Washington to California, where it grows in the coniferous forests of the inland and coastal mountain ranges. It is a dominant shrub in the mountain understory chaparral in many areas.

Description
Arctostaphylos nevadensis is a short, spreading shrub forming mats, tangles, or mounds less than half a meter tall. The larger branches have dull red bark and the twigs are generally woolly. Leaves are bright green and shiny, with few hairs especially along the edges. They measure 1 to 3 centimeters in length. The shrub blooms in spherical clusters of urn-shaped whitish manzanita flowers. The fruit is a spherical drupe about 7 millimeters wide.

Cultivation
This species is cultivated as a chaparral landscaping plant and it is used to stabilize soil against erosion on mountain slopes.

See also

California chaparral and woodlands

References

External links
Jepson Manual Treatment - Arctostaphylos nevadensis
USDA Plants Profile; Arctostaphylos nevadensis
Arctostaphylos nevadensis - Photo gallery

nevadensis
Flora of California
Flora of Oregon
Flora of Washington (state)
Flora of the Cascade Range
Flora of the Klamath Mountains
Flora of the Sierra Nevada (United States)
Plants described in 1878
Flora without expected TNC conservation status